I Love You, China is a song composed for a soprano by Zheng Qiufeng to the lyrics of Qu Cong for the film Overseas Compatriots (Chinese: 海外赤子) (1979) starring Chen Chong  (Chinese: 陳冲), also known as Joan Chen. The voice of the song that appeared in the film is that of Ye Peiying. In the film, the heroine, Huang Sihua, sings this song on an entrance examination of a music conservatory.

Although the song originally appeared in a film, it has since been heard on many occasions as a stand-alone piece for its beauty and artistic merit. The song demands the voice of a masterful soprano. It has been sung by many singers, but the version as rendered by Ye Peiying is regarded as the most beautiful one.

External links
 Listen to I Love You, China
 Video Clip of the Song from Overseas Compatriots

Chinese patriotic songs
1979 songs
Songs written for films
Songs about China
Mandarin-language songs